Pavel Karpf (10 May 1969 – 10 December 2021) was a Swiss professional footballer who played as a goalkeeper.

On 7 December 2021, Karpf suffered a heart attack while being on a boat trip in Croatia, and died three days later, at the age of 52.

References

1969 births
2021 deaths
Swiss men's footballers
Association football goalkeepers
Swiss Super League players
BSC Old Boys players
FC Luzern players
Sportspeople from Aargau